The Efjord Bridges are a series of three bridges that cross the  wide Efjorden in Narvik Municipality in Nordland county, Norway. The bridges are a part of the European route E6 highway and they were opened in 1969. The three bridges connect the mainland sides of the fjord via two small islands in the fjord. The easternmost bridge is the Kjerringstraumen Bridge, then comes the Mellastraumen Bridge, and finally the Sørstraumen Bridge.

The Kjerringstraumen Bridge is a suspension bridge. The bridge has 15 spans. This bridge connects the mainland on the east side of the fjord to the island of Storøya. It's the longest of the three bridges.
This small bridge connects the islands of Storøya and Halvardøya. This is the smallest of the bridges.
This bridge connects the tiny island of Halvardøya to the mainland on the western side of the fjord. (This bridge should not be confused with the Sørstraumen Bridge in Troms.)

References

Ballangen
Road bridges in Nordland
Bridges completed in 1969
1969 establishments in Norway
Suspension bridges in Norway
Roads within the Arctic Circle